Luyuan Subdistrict is a subdistrict in northern Tongzhou District, Beijing. It borders Lucheng Town in its north and east, Yongshun Town in its south, and Tongyun Subdistrict in its west. As of 2020, it had 8,472 people residing inside its borders.

The subdistrict was created from a portion of Lucheng Town in 2018.

Administrative divisions 
As of 2021, Luyuan Subdistrict had 6 residential communities under its administration:

Gallery

See also 

 List of township-level divisions of Beijing

References 

Tongzhou District, Beijing
Subdistricts of Beijing